Marc Scibilia is an American singer-songwriter born and raised in Buffalo, New York, currently based in East Nashville, Tennessee. His self-titled EP released in 2012 included the song "How Bad We Need Each Other" which was featured in the hit television series Bones.

In 2015, Scibilia's version of Woody Guthrie's folk classic "This Land Is Your Land" was featured in Jeep's "Beautiful Lands" Super Bowl commercial. The ad fared well, making Scibilia one of the most Shazam-ed artists of the telecast and led to mentions in several publications.

His debut album, Out Of Style, was released on October 30, 2015, amidst tours with James Bay, Zac Brown Band and ZZ Ward as well as an appearance on The Today Show.

Scibilia collaborated with German musician, DJ and producer Robin Schulz in 2017 for Schulz's fourth single "Unforgettable" off of his album Uncovered. The song has been certified Gold in Germany and reached No. 1 on the German airplay radio chart.

Early life
By the time Scibilia was six he started drum lessons and writing his own songs. In high school he began classical piano training with Steve Parisi, and eventually picked up guitar. He grew up in a musical family. His father and grandfather were professional musicians while pursuing other vocations to support their families. Specifically, his grandfather Tony had his own orchestra and played bass alongside famed guitarist Tommy Tedesco. Scibilia's brother Matt plays drums in his touring band and has played for Brendan Benson, Cory Chisel, Colorfeels and more.

Career 
Scibilia moved to Nashville after high school determined to make it as a musician. In 2007 he released his debut EP Fixity, followed by From Brooklyn To Maine in 2009.

In 2010, Scibilia signed with Sony ATV for publishing. By 2012 he released his self-titled EP, which included "How Bad We Need Each Other", a song that was featured on the FOX Network series Bones. The song also appeared in NBC's About a Boy.

On October 30, 2015, Scibilia released his debut full-length album Out Of Style that debuted on the Singer-Songwriter chart at No. 7.

Outside of his own records, he is a prevalent songwriter. In 2014 he wrote and produced the song "Bright Lights" for American Idol contestant Paul McDonald. In 2016 Scibilia co-wrote "Focus" with Jacob Whitesides for his upcoming 2016 release Why?

Scibilia worked with Sony/ATV's Brian Monaco on a cover of Woody Guthrie's song "This Land Is Your Land" that was included in the Jeep TV commercial "Beautiful Lands" for Super Bowl XLIX on February 1, 2015.

Scibilia has toured with James Bay, ZZ Ward, Butch Walker, Gavin James, Steve Winwood, Zac Brown Band, Ben Rector, Drew Holcomb and the Neighbors, Green River Ordinance, and Michael Franti amongst others. He has also opened for the Wallflowers, John Oates (Hall & Oates) and Sixpence None the Richer. He played with Sixpence None the Richer and collaborated with Leigh Nash of the band, where they wrote the Christmas song "Deeper Than You Know".

In 2015 he performed at NFL Draft Town as part of the festivities surrounding the NFL Draft that year.

On December 5, 2016, Scibilia released a cover of John Lennon's "Happy Xmas (War Is Over)" with fellow Nashville-based musician Lennon Stella of the Canadian duo Lennon & Maisy.

On February 10, 2017, Marc Scibilia released his single "Summer Clothes" independently through his label, Good Lander Records, and on March 6, he released the music video for the song via a premiere on Rolling Stone including dates for his first headline tour, The Summer Clothes Tour. His single, "On The Way," was included in his second Jeep commercial on TV where he was also featured performing the song on a beach live. The Summer of Jeep Campaign featured the summer line of Jeep vehicles and ran from May through September 2017.

Scibilia collaborated with Hungarian progressive house DJ producer duo Stadiumx on the song "Those Were the Days" released on July 14, 2017. Scibilia's next collaboration, with German musician, DJ and producer Robin Schulz produced the song "Unforgettable" released on September 29, 2017, as a part of Schulz album Uncovered. "Unforgettable" has been certified Gold by the Federal Music Industry Association and has reached the No. 1 position on the German radio airplay charts. Scibilia joined Schulz on select dates of his Germany arena tour in October 2017. On March 21, 2018, Scibilia joined Schulz at the WDM Radio Awards to perform "Unforgettable" in front of a record crowd of 90,000 attendees at Estadio Azteca in Mexico City.

Discography
Studio albums
 Fixity (2007)
 From Brooklyn to Maine – EP (2009)
 Marc Scibilia – EP (2012)
 The Shape I'm In – EP (2013) 
 Out of Style – EP (2015) 
 Out of Style (2015)
 7th & Christopher – EP (2018)
 Seed of Joy (2020)

References

External links
MarcScibilia.com – Official Marc Scibilia website
YouTube.com – Marc Scibilia on YouTube

American folk singers
American rock singers
American harmonica players
American rock songwriters
Singer-songwriters from New York (state)
Living people
Musicians from Buffalo, New York
1986 births
21st-century American singers
Sony Music Publishing artists
I.R.S. Records artists
Capitol Records artists
21st-century American male singers
American male singer-songwriters